Lithoxus is a genus of suckermouth armored catfishes native to tropical South America.

Taxonomy 
Lithoxus is supported as a monophyletic sister to Exastilithoxus. Together, these two genera form a well-supported clade.

Species
There are currently eight recognized species in this genus:
 Lithoxus boujardi So. Muller & Isbrücker, 1993
 Lithoxus bovallii (Regan, 1906)
 Lithoxus jantjae Lujan, 2008
 Lithoxus lithoides C. H. Eigenmann, 1912
 Lithoxus pallidimaculatus Boeseman, 1982
 Lithoxus planquettei Boeseman, 1982
 Lithoxus stocki Nijssen & Isbrücker, 1990
 Lithoxus surinamensis Boeseman, 1982

Distribution
Lithoxus range from the Oyapock drainage along the border between Brazil and French Guiana, through Suriname west to the Tacutu River along the border between Guyana and Brazil and south to the Uatama and Trombetas rivers of Brazil.

Description
Lithoxus contains some of the most dorsoventrally flattened fishes in the world. They can be distinguished from most loricariids by having a round instead of oval lower lip. The lower lip is large and round as in Exastilithoxus with the edge sometimes frilled, but not with the barbels seen in Exastilithoxus.

Lithoxus species have a unique, enlarged, thin-walled stomach from which the intestine exits dorsally. The stomach is expanded, thin-walled, and clear and is used in breathing air. A thin, clear tube exits the main body of the stomach anterodorsally, terminating at the pylorus just anterior to the posterior extent of the stomach. The intestine tends to have less coils than other members of Ancistrini. The expanded stomach is slightly larger in males; this is due to the males having more space due to a difference in the relative size of the gonads.

Colouration in Lithoxus species is typically slate gray to tan with a few lighter markings on the body; there are occasionally bands in the pectoral and caudal fins. The ventral surface ranges from white to slightly lighter than the sides. The abdomen is naked (scaleless and unplated). The caudal fin is slightly forked.

Breeding males develop extremely long odontodes on the leading edge of the pectoral fin spine.

Ecology 
Lithoxus species are rheophilic, meaning they prefer to inhabit fast-moving water. Lithoxus is said to inhabit both rivulets and medium-sized creeks. Lithoxus have been collected from riffles on the main-stem Essequibo River in Guyana. These peripheral habitats are among the first parts of the river to dry and the respiratory stomach may have evolved to handle this periodic drying. The flattened morphology suggests that Lithoxus species live under rocks.

Lithoxus have a unique air-holding stomach. Lithoxus (along with its sister, Exastilithoxus) are fairly unusual among loricariids in that they subsist entirely on a diet of insect larvae. The large size and small number of eggs suggest that parental care is well developed, but nothing is known of the breeding habits of Lithoxus.

References 

Ancistrini
Fish of South America
Fish of Brazil
Fauna of the Guianas
Fish of French Guiana
Fish of Suriname
Catfish genera
Taxa named by Carl H. Eigenmann
Freshwater fish genera